Izumikawa (written: 泉川) is a Japanese surname. Notable people with the surname include:

, Japanese modern pentathlete
, Okinawan karateka
Laura Izumikawa, American photographer
, Japanese volleyball player
, Japanese golfer
, Japanese astronomer
, Japanese artist, singer-songwriter, voice actress, composer and producer

Japanese-language surnames